Shulganovo (Şulğan) is a rural locality (a selo) and the administrative centre of Shulganovsky Selsoviet, Tatyshlinsky District, Bashkortostan, Russia. The population was 925 as of 2010. There are 6 streets.

Geography 
Shulganovo is located 36 km southwest of Verkhniye Tatyshly (the district's administrative centre) by road. Zilyaktau is the nearest rural locality.

References 

Rural localities in Tatyshlinsky District